The Liberia women's national basketball team is the national basketball team representing Liberia. It is administrated by the Liberia Basketball Federation.

It appeared at the 2005 FIBA Africa Championship for Women qualification stage.

See also
 Liberia women's national under-19 basketball team
 Liberia women's national under-17 basketball team
 Liberia women's national 3x3 team

References

External links
Welcome to Friends and Supporters of Liberian Basketball, Inc.
Fiba Africa – Official Website
Liberia Basketball Records at FIBA Archive
Welcome to Liberia #1 Online Basketball Portal

Women's national basketball teams
Basketball
Basketball teams in Liberia
Basketball
Women's sport in Liberia